The Red Summer is the first special extended play and the  by South Korean girl group Red Velvet. Marketed as the group's first "special summer" release, the five-track EP was released digitally on July 9, 2017, and physically the following day by SM Entertainment. Primarily a dance-pop and EDM record, it is the second major release from Red Velvet to focus solely on their "red" concept, following their debut studio album The Red (2015). It was later proceeded by Summer Magic as both the second "special summer" extended play and the third major "red" release.

The Red Summer received positive reviews from music critics, who complimented its showcasing of the group's "bright and vivid" side. It was a commercial success, becoming the group's sixth consecutive Gaon Album Chart topper and their third to debut atop the Billboard World Albums chart, thus setting the record for the most number-one albums among K-pop girl groups at the time. The EP spawned the single "Red Flavor", and has since become one of the group's signature songs.

Background and release
After concluding music show promotion for their fourth extended play Rookie in February, Red Velvet released the digital single "Would U" as the first release for the second season of the label project SM Station. On June 23, 2017, S.M. Entertainment announced that Red Velvet would be releasing an album in July for a summer comeback (a first for the group) and had recently finished filming the music video. At around midnight on June 30, the first set of teaser images were released through the company's official website, the group's official Instagram, and the group's promotional Twitter account, which was created the same month. Later that day, they posted another set of teasers which revealed the album title and the full track list which includes the title track, "Red Flavor". The album was officially released digitally on July 9 and physically on July 10, and was distributed by Genie Music. The physical album was released in two formats: a CD version and Kihno kit.

Composition 
The Red Summer consists of five songs that incorporate genres like dance-pop and EDM. The lead single "Red Flavor" was described by writer Tamar Herman of Billboard magazine as an electropop song with "dramatic synths and a percussive melody." Originally produced by production team Caesar & Loui, the track features background vocals from songwriter Ylva Dimberg and a distorted lyrics "red flavor" done by Lindell himself. It was later rewritten in Korean by SM songwriter and producer Kenzie, whom had previously worked with the group on their first studio album and their third extended play. Jeff Benjamin of Fuse magazine described the song as a "super-simple-to-swallow piece of pop" and wrote that the album consists of five 'feel-good' tracks. "You Better Know" is a warm EDM song. The tropical dance track "Zoo" is a throwback to the group's animal sound-infused debut single "Happiness". "Mojito" was defined as a saccharine, glossy, electropop song and lastly, "Hear the Sea" is a mid-tempo R&B track.

Reception

While Tamar Herman of Billboard, Jeff Benjamin of Fuse magazine and Chase McMullen of The 405 praised the title track and EP for its summery vibe, with McMullen giving the EP an 8/10 and Hermann commenting on its "dynamic in its jam-packed but not overpowering production" while concluding that it is "sure to be one of the summer's K-pop earworms", Lee Gi-seon of IZM magazine was more neutral and gave the EP 3 out of 5 stars, but had a more positive response to the single "Red Flavor". Chester Chin of The Star described the album as a "sizzling affair that highlights the girl group's more vivid and upbeat side".

The Red Summer claimed the no.1 spot on the South Korean Gaon Album Chart on the third week of July, with the title track "Red Flavor" topping both the Gaon Digital Chart and the Gaon Download Chart. All five tracks from the EP also debuted in the Top 50 of the Digital Chart: "Red Flavor" (no. 1), "You Better Know" (no. 14), "Zoo" (no. 24), "Mojito" (no. 32) and "Hear The Sea" (no. 35).

The Red Summer marks the third time the group has topped Billboard's World Albums chart, making them, at the time, the K-pop girl group with the most no. 1 albums on the chart. The record was tied by their label mate Girls' Generation in August of the same year but was once again beaten by Red Velvet with the release of their second studio album Perfect Velvet in November. According to the site, the EP sold over 1,000 copies within the week, making it at the time the group's best US sales week. It also entered Billboards Top Heatseekers Albums Chart at no. 8, the first time the group has charted in the Top 10. The album also peaked at no. 25 on Billboards Independent Albums which is the first time the group entered the chart. In Japan, it debuted at no. 27 on the Oricon Albums Chart, which was also their highest-peaking position at the time.

Promotion
The single "Red Flavor" had an unconventional release and was performed live by the group at an SMTOWN concert in Seoul on July 8 before the song's digital release along with its music video a day later. 10 minutes after its release on July 9, the group had their first music show performance on Inkigayo where they also performed "You Better Know". They continued appearing on several music shows such as The Show, M Countdown, Music Bank and Show Champion where they earned their first music show trophy for "Red Flavor" on July 20, 2017.

Track listing

Personnel
Credits adapted from the liner notes of The Red Summer.

 S.M. Entertainment Co., Ltd.executive producer
 Lee Soo-manproducer
 Lee Seong-sooproducing director
 Jeong Eui-seok (S.M. Blue Cup Studio)recording engineer
 Lee Ji-hong (S.M. LYVIN Studio)recording engineer
 Lee Min-gyu (S.M. Big Shot Studio)recording engineer
 Yoo Ji-sang (MonoTree Studio)recording engineer
 Hwang Hyun (MonoTree Studio)recording engineer
 Jeong Eun-kyeong (In Grid Studio)recording engineer
 Ahn Chang-kyurecording engineer
 On Seong-yoon (sound POOL Studios)recording engineer
 Jeong Ki-hong (Seoul Studio)recording engineer
 Ji Yong-joo (Seoul Studio)recording engineer assistant
 Nam Koong-jin (S.M. Concert Hall Studio)mixing engineer
 Koo Jong-pil (Beat Burger) (S.M. Yellow Tail Studio)mixing engineer
 Kim Cheol-soon (S.M. Blue Ocean Studio)mixing engineer
 Jeong Ui-seok (S.M. Blue Cup Studio)mixing engineer
 Chris Gehringer (Sterling Sound)master engineer
 Min Hee-jincreative director
 Min Hee-jinmusic video direction and arrangement
 Kim Ju-youngmusic video direction and arrangement
 Park Yoon-seonmusic video direction and arrangement
 Seong Chang-wonmusic video director
 Jo Woo-cheolart direction and design
 Cho Woo-shikart direction and design
 Kim Ye-jinstylist
 Yoon Seo-hahair stylist
 Soon-eehair stylist
 Shin Kyung-mimake-up artist
 Song Si-youngphotography
 Kim Young-min – executive supervisor
 Red Velvetvocals, Polaroid photography
 Irenevocals, Polaroid photography
 Seulgivocals, Polaroid photography
 Wendyvocals, Polaroid photography
 Joyvocals, Polaroid photography
 Yerivocals, Polaroid photography

Charts

Weekly charts

Monthly charts

Release history

References

External links
 "Red Flavor" music video

Red Velvet (group) EPs
2017 EPs
SM Entertainment EPs
Korean-language EPs
Genie Music EPs
Albums produced by LDN Noise